Kuwait participated in the 3rd West Asian Games held in Doha, Qatar from December 1, 2005 to December 10, 2005. Kuwait ranked 2nd with 25 gold medals in this edition of the West Asian Games.

References

West Asian Games
Nations at the 2005 West Asian Games

Kuwait at the West Asian Games